The Mowbray River is a river of the south Canterbury region of New Zealand's South Island. A short upper tributary of the Orari River, it flows north from its sources in the Four Peaks Range northeast of Fairlie.

See also
List of rivers of New Zealand

References

Rivers of Canterbury, New Zealand
Rivers of New Zealand